The 2021 IIHF World Championship Division II was scheduled to be an international ice hockey tournament run by the International Ice Hockey Federation.

The Group A tournament would have been held in Beijing, China from 10 to 16 April and the Group B tournament in Reykjavík, Iceland from 18 to 24 April 2021.

On 18 November 2020, both tournaments were cancelled due to the COVID-19 pandemic.

Group A tournament

Participants

Standings

Group B tournament

Participants

Standings

References

2020
Division II
2021 IIHF World Championship Division II
2021 IIHF World Championship Division II
Sports competitions in Beijing
Sports competitions in Reykjavík
2021 in Chinese sport
2021 in Icelandic sport
April 2021 sports events in China
April 2021 sports events in Europe
Ice hockey events cancelled due to the COVID-19 pandemic